Aphaobius is a genus of beetles belonging to the family Leiodidae.

The species of this genus are found in Southern Europe.

Species

Species:

Aphaobius alphonsi 
Aphaobius angusticollis 
Aphaobius brevicornis

References

Leiodidae